Park Kyung-Min (박경민 : born August 22, 1990) is a South Korean football player previously play for Persija Jakarta in Indonesia Super League.

References

External links
PARK KYUNG MIN at Liga Indonesia
 

1990 births
Living people
South Korean footballers
South Korean expatriate footballers
South Korean expatriate sportspeople in Indonesia
Expatriate footballers in Indonesia
Liga 1 (Indonesia) players
Persija Jakarta players
Association football midfielders
People from Cheonan
Sportspeople from South Chungcheong Province